Diego Cortés Vargas (born 8 July 1998) is a Spanish footballer who plays as a forward.

Club career
Born in Huelva, Andalusia, Vargas was a Recreativo de Huelva youth graduate. He made his senior debut with the reserves on 3 January 2016, playing the last 39 minutes in a 2–1 Primera Andaluza home win against CD San Roque de Lepe B.

Vargas made his first team debut on 7 May 2016, playing the last four minutes of a 1–1 away draw against CD San Roque de Lepe in the Segunda División B championship.   He only scored his first senior goal on 17 September of the following year, netting the B's opener in a 2–1 Tercera División home win against CD Gerena.

On 17 January 2019, after alternating between the first team and the B-side, Vargas signed for Sevilla FC and was assigned to the C-team in the fourth division. On 5 August, he moved to Salamanca CF UDS, but only featured for the reserves.

On 23 January 2020, Vargas agreed to a contract with another reserve team, Atlético Albacete still in the fourth division. He made his debut with the main squad on 16 December, coming on as a second-half substitute for Nahuel Arroyo in a 0–1 away loss against Córdoba CF, for the season's Copa del Rey.

Vargas' professional debut occurred on 21 December 2020, as he replaced Álvaro Peña in a 2–0 Segunda División away success over CD Mirandés.

References

External links

1998 births
Living people
Footballers from Huelva
Spanish footballers
Association football forwards
Segunda División players
Segunda División B players
Tercera División players
Primera Andaluza players
Atlético Onubense players
Recreativo de Huelva players
Sevilla FC C players
Atlético Albacete players
Albacete Balompié players